The Christian Medical Fellowship (CMF), founded in 1949, is an evangelical, interdenominational organisation that links together Christian doctors, medical students, nurses and midwives in the United Kingdom (UK).

CMFs stated aims are "uniting Christian doctors", "supporting Christian medical students", "advancing Christian mission", "publishing Christian literature", "encourage and equip Christian doctors and nurses to live and speak for Jesus Christ" and "promoting Christian values". The organisation publishes two journals, Triple Helix (for doctors) and Nucleus (for students), several smaller publications, and some books. CMF organises conferences on a local and national basis and promotes and supports Christian medical mission overseas.

CMF is linked to similar organisations in many countries through the International Christian Medical and Dental Association and the Universities and Colleges Christian Fellowship for its medical students.

Medical ethics
CMF regularly contributes to debate on issues of medical ethics, such as making submissions to the UK House of Lords enquiry into physician-assisted suicide, and is opposed to legal access to abortion and euthanasia in the United Kingdom. In some of these activities, CMF works together with other faith-based and non-faith-based groups, such as the Care Not Killing Alliance and the Lawyers' Christian Fellowship.

The position of the Christian Medical Fellowship has been to actively encourage doctors and medical students to use opportunities arising from the doctor-patient relationship to discuss faith with patients.

Criticism
The Christian Medical Fellowship has been the subject of complaint from several Hindu leaders to the House of Lords Select Committee on Religious Offences objecting to a claim that Hinduism was a 'false religion.'.

In October 2007, the Christian Medical Fellowship was accused by The Guardian newspaper of attempting to skew the balance of evidence presented at the Parliamentary review of the UK's laws on abortion due to a number of its members presenting evidence at the Parliamentary Select Committee without revealing their membership and seniority within the organisation. The members concerned stated that they were submitting evidence as individuals, not as representatives of CMF, and they declared their affiliation when asked to do so in an unusual step by the Committee.

See also

Association of American Physicians and Surgeons
Lawyers Christian Fellowship
International Christian Medical and Dental Association

References

External links
Christian Medical Fellowship Official Site

Evangelicalism in the United Kingdom
Medical associations based in the United Kingdom
Organizations established in 1949
Evangelical parachurch organizations